Eddie Ivan Garcia (born April 15, 1960) is a former American football placekicker in the National Football League (NFL).

Early life
Garcia was born in New Orleans, Louisiana.

Career
Garcia was drafted by the Green Bay Packers in the tenth round of the 1982 NFL Draft and later played two seasons with the team. He played at the collegiate level at Southern Methodist University.

He holds the record for total fields goals made at SMU, with 44 (tied with Chase Hover).

On July 26, 2021, Garcia was voted on to the Packers Board of Directors.

See also
List of Green Bay Packers players

References

1960 births
Living people
Green Bay Packers players
American football placekickers
SMU Mustangs football players
Players of American football from New Orleans